The FIL European Luge Natural Track Championships 1977 took place in Seis am Schlern, Italy.

Men's singles

Women's singles

Mitterstieler becomes the first non-Austrian to win this event at the natural track European championships.

Men's doubles

Medal table

References
Men's doubles natural track European champions
Men's singles natural track European champions
Women's singles natural track European champions

FIL European Luge Natural Track Championships
1977 in luge
1970 in Italian sport
Luge in Italy
International sports competitions hosted by Italy